Artur Andreyevich Lauta (born February 14, 1996) is a Russian ice hockey player. He is currently playing with Avangard Omsk of the Kontinental Hockey League (KHL).

Lauta made his Kontinental Hockey League debut playing with Avangard Omsk during the 2014–15 KHL season.

Career statistics

Regular season and playoffs

International

References

External links

1996 births
Living people
Avangard Omsk players
Russian ice hockey forwards
Sportspeople from Omsk